Condaminea is a genus of flowering plants in the family Rubiaceae. They are found in Central and tropical South America.

Species 
Condaminea corymbosa (Ruiz & Pav.) DC.
Condaminea elegans Delprete
Condaminea glabrata DC.
Condaminea microcarpa (Ruiz & Pav.) DC.
Condaminea venosa (Ruiz & Pav.) DC.

References

External links 
 Condaminea in the World Checklist of Rubiaceae

Rubiaceae genera
Dialypetalantheae